BWA or Bwa may refer to:

Codes
 Botswana, ISO country code 
 BWIA West Indies Airways, ICAO code (predecessor of Caribbean Airlines)
 Caribbean Airlines, ICAO code 
 Gautam Buddha Airport, IATA code

Companies and organisations
 Baptist World Alliance
 Basketball Western Australia
 Billiards World Cup Association, a former carom-governing body
 Black Women's Action, a 1970s Australian activist group which later became the Roberta Sykes Foundation
 Black Women's Alliance, former name of Third World Women's Alliance, an American Black feminist group established in 1970
 Bosnian Wand Airlines, an airline of Bosnia and Herzegovina

Languages and people
 Baboa people of the Democratic Republic of the Congo, also known as Bwa
 Bwa languages, a branch of the Gur languages spoken by the Bwa people of Burkina Faso and Mali
 Bwa language, a Bantu language spoken in the Democratic Republic of Congo.
 Bwa people of Burkina Faso and Mali

Other uses
Boil-water advisory, a public health advisory notice when water has been contaminated by pathogens
 British West Africa, The Gambia, Sierra Leone, Ghana, and Nigeria in the colonial era
 Broadband Wireless Access, technology that provides high-speed wireless Internet access or computer networking access over a wide area
 Burrows–Wheeler Aligner, a bioinformatic tool (algorithm) to map short nucleotide sequences to a reference genome
 Red Bull Big Wave Africa, a surfing competition

See also
Baseball Writers' Association of America (BBWAA)